Hezuo Road Subdistrict is a subdistrict of Xinhua District, in the northwest of Shijiazhuang, Hebei, People's Republic of China. , it has 6 residential communities under its administration.

See also
List of township-level divisions of Hebei

References

Township-level divisions of Hebei